Tolsem Shahbaz (also Romanized as Ţolsem Shahbāz) is a village in Posht Tang Rural District, in the Central District of Sarpol-e Zahab County, Kermanshah Province, Iran. At the 2006 census, its population was 186, in 32 families.

References 

Populated places in Sarpol-e Zahab County